This is a list of Canadian provinces and territories by life expectancy. Life expectancy is the average number of years of age that a group of infants born in the same year can expect to live, if maintained, from birth. The source is from the Canadian Vital Statistics Death Database.

Life expectancy has increased in most Canadian provinces and territories due to medical advances in treating diseases such as heart disease and cancer - leading causes of death elsewhere worldwide. There were high gains in life expectancy in Nunavut due to improved rural health care; however, there were notable decreases in life expectancy in Newfoundland and Labrador.

Life expectancy in 2020 at birth

Past life expectancy

Life expectancy by health region, 2015-2017 3-year averages

See also

Notes

References 

Lists of provinces and territories of Canada
Canada, life expectancy
Canada